Polish National Flag Day, also known as the Day of the Flag of the Republic of Poland, is a national holiday in Poland introduced by an act issued on 20 February 2004. The holiday is celebrated  on the day between two national holidays: 1 May (called International Workers' Day) and 3rd of May (May 3rd Constitution Day)

On the same day, the Day of Polish Community Abroad is celebrated.

2 May is not a national holiday, however many Poles take this day off because it is the only date in the calendar which occurs between two national holidays.

Establishment of the holiday 
On 15 October 2003, a member's bill (written by Edward Płonek) was introduced to the Marshal on the amendments to the Act on the emblem, colours and anthem of the Polish Republic which established National Polish Flag Day. More importantly, May 2nd was chosen to be the National Flag day due to historic reasons. During the communist rule (approximately 1945 to 1989) the people of Poland were forced to display the national flags (together with all red flags, symbolizing workers unity) on May 1st, May Day, or International Workers Holiday. Prior to the communist takeover, May 3rd, the anniversary of the enactment of the May Constitution, was celebrated as a National Holiday in Poland. The communist rulers did away with celebrations of May 3rd, considering is a bourgeois, capitalist holiday, and ordered that all the Polish flags were to be removed from public view by May 2nd, so that they could not be seen on May 3rd, the date of the former National Holiday. Many people in Poland, however, refused to do so, and whenever the communist authorities would see the National Flag being flown on May 2nd, they would fine or even arrest the people who were responsible for flying it. 

In the course of legislative work, the Senate of the Republic of Poland, in its Resolution of 12 February 2004, proposed amendments such as: replacing Polish National Flag Day with the Day of the White Eagle, recognizing the emblem as the chief among the symbols of the Republic of Poland. Eventually, the Sejm rejected the amendment and, on 20 February 2004, established National Flag Day of the Republic of Poland.

The celebration 
Various types of patriotic actions and demonstrations are organized on this day. For example, on 2 May 2009 in Bytom, over 500 people created a white and red flag from previously prepared and simultaneously lifted umbrellas. It was probably the largest flag created in Poland on the occasion of the National Flag Day.

In recent years, it has become common to wear a national cockade on that day. This custom was popularized by President Lech Kaczyński. Then it was continued by Bronisław Komorowski, and now Andrzej Duda is also maintaining the custom.

Interesting facts 
On 2 May 1945, the First Polish Army conquering the capital of Nazi Germany put a white and red flag on the Berlin Victory Column - Siegessäule and on the Reichstag in Berlin. During the time of the Polish People's Republic, on this day, the state flags were removed after celebrating 1 May, so that the flags would not be exposed on the following day - the 3 May Constitution Day which was abolished by the communist authorities.

National Flag Day in the World 
Similarly to Poland, the celebration of the national flag is also celebrated in many other countries, including the United States, Mexico, Argentina, Finland, Turkmenistan, Lithuania, Ukraine and China.

References

National symbols of Poland
Public holidays in Poland
Flag days
Flags of Poland